Naya Safar is a 1982 Bollywood film where Javed Khan  romances Arti Gupta who is playing the female lead. Kamini Kaushal, Dev Kumar and Rajendranath play key supporting roles in the movie.

Soundtrack
Lyrics: Surendra Sathi

References

External links
 

1982 films
Films scored by Nadeem–Shravan
1980s Hindi-language films